Laiyuan may refer to:

Laiyuan County (涞源县), of Baoding, Hebei
Chinese cruiser Laiyuan (來遠), armoured cruiser of the Beiyang Fleet during the Qing Dynasty
Laiyuan, Qi County, Shanxi (来远镇), town in Qi County, Shanxi